The White Masai (originally published in German as Die weiße Massai) is an autobiographical novel written by Corinne Hofmann about the years she spent in Kenya. It was published in German in 1998 and translated into English in 2005. A film adaptation was released in 2005.

In 2013, the novel was being translated into Chinese.

Summary 
The novel tells the story of Corinne's trip from her home country of Switzerland to Kenya, as a tourist in the company of her fiancé Marco.  wile at the ferry she see and  falls l in love with Lketinga, a Maasai warrior. .Before their vacation is over she makes a decision that she would go to switzerland sell her dressmaking business and get back to Kenya to live with her 'new found love' This is in spite the fact that she has not told Lketinga of her plans. She breaks up with Marco and once they get back to Switzerland ,she moves out of the apartment she had been sharing with her fiance as she prepares to get back to Kenya.

Over the course of the novel, she travels around Kenya, as well as back to Switzerland. In Kenya, she suffered hardships like poor living conditions,tropical diseases and she nearly loses her pregnancy, but persisted. She marries Lketinga amidst many challenges and they have a child and they name her Napirai.

Their marriage is a rocky one. She sets up a shop In Barsoli but it fails. She sets up a tourist shop in Ukunda which becomes a success. Her husband's jealousy fits  makes her feel insecure and eventually, she flees Kenya with her daughter and returns to Switzerland.

References 

2006 novels
Autobiographical novels
Swiss novels